Bir al-Ghanam is a town in western Libya. It is located south of Zawiya. It was the site of several battles during the Libyan Civil War. It was occupied by anti-Gaddafi forces on 7 August, just a few weeks before they entered Tripoli.

Notes

Populated places in Zawiya District